Below is a list of famous hypnotists.

Historical

 Étienne Eugène Azam
 Vladimir Bekhterev
 Hippolyte Bernheim
 Alfred Binet
 James Braid (surgeon)
 John Milne Bramwell
 Jean-Martin Charcot
 Émile Coué
 John Elliotson
 Dave Elman
 Milton Hyland Erickson
 James Esdaile
 George Estabrooks
 Abbé Faria
 Sigmund Freud
 Pierre Janet
 Edith Klemperer
 Ambroise-Auguste Liébeault
 Ormond McGill
 Franz Mesmer
 Albert Moll
 Julian Ochorowicz
 Ivan Pavlov
 Morton Prince
 Marquis de Puységur
 Otto Georg Wetterstrand
 Alvaro Uribe Velez

Contemporary
 Derren Brown
 Giucas Casella
 Boris Cherniak
 Kimberly Friedmutter
 Chris Hughes
 Barrie Leslie Konicov
 Paul McKenna
 Michael Newton
 Peter Powers
 Peter Reveen
 Hollywood Hypnotist Kevin Stone

See also
List of fictional hypnotists

 
Hypnotists